The 2018–19 Wisconsin Badgers men's basketball team represented the University of Wisconsin–Madison in the 2018–19 NCAA Division I men's basketball season. The Badgers were led by fourth-year head coach Greg Gard and played their home games at the Kohl Center in Madison, Wisconsin as members of the Big Ten Conference. They finished the season 23–11, 14–6 in Big Ten play to finish in fourth place. In the Big Ten tournament, the Badgers defeated Nebraska in the quarterfinals before losing to Michigan State in the semifinals. They received an at-large bid to the NCAA tournament as the No. 5 seed in the South Region, their 24th trip to the NCAA Tournament. They were upset in the First Round by No. 12-seeded Oregon.

Previous season
The Badgers finished the 2017–18 season 15–18, 7–11 in Big Ten play to finish in ninth place. They defeated eighth-seeded Maryland in the Big Ten tournament, but lost to top-seeded Michigan State in the next round. They failed to reach the NCAA tournament for the first time since 1998.

Offseason

Departures

Incoming transfers

Returning players
Redshirt junior forward Ethan Happ announced his intent to enter the NBA draft on April 2, 2018 without hiring an agent. He withdrew himself from the draft on May 30 after not being invited to the combine.

2018 Recruiting class

Roster

Schedule and results

|-
!colspan=12 style=| Exhibition

|-
!colspan=12 style=|Regular season

|-
!colspan=9 style=|Big Ten tournament

|-
!colspan=9 style=|NCAA tournament

Rankings 

^Coaches did not release a Week 1 poll.
*AP does not release post-NCAA tournament rankings

Player statistics

References

Wisconsin Badgers men's basketball seasons
Wisconsin
Badgers men's basketball team
Badgers men's basketball team
Wisconsin